Kukowo  (German Kuckow) is a village in the administrative district of Gmina Słupsk, within Słupsk County, Pomeranian Voivodeship, in northern Poland.

Before 1945 the area of Farther Pomerania, where the village is located,  was part of Germany. It was an estate belonging to the village of Roggatz. After World War II the region became part of Poland. For the history of the region, see History of Pomerania.

The village has a population of 212.

References

Kukowo